Arthur Susskind (October 12, 1886 – March 10, 1967), also known as "Young Otto", was an American professional boxer who set a world record with 16 consecutive first-round knockouts in the early 1900s. His record stood until Edwin Valero of Venezuela scored 18 straight first-round knockouts in 2006.

Professional boxing record
All information in this section is derived from BoxRec, unless otherwise stated.

Official Record

All newspaper decisions are officially regarded as “no decision” bouts and are not counted as a win, loss or draw.

Unofficial record

Record with the inclusion of newspaper decisions to the win/loss/draw column.

References

1886 births
1967 deaths
Jewish American boxers
Jewish boxers
Place of birth missing
American male boxers
Light-welterweight boxers